Henry Wright Strong (December 11, 1810 in Amherst, Hampshire County, Massachusetts – February 28, 1848 in Troy, Rensselaer County, New York) was an American lawyer and politician from New York.

Life
He was the son of Hezekiah W. Strong (1768–1848) and Martha (Dwight) Strong (1783–1844). He graduated from Amherst College in 1825. Then he studied law with his brother-in-law, Judge Isaac McConihe, at Troy, was admitted to the bar in 1829, and practiced in Troy.

He was Recorder of Troy from 1838 to 1844. He married Sarah Elizabeth Cornell (b. 1823), and they had two sons: Latham Cornell Strong (1845–1879), a poet who published four volumes of verse; and posthumous Henry Wright Strong (1848–1851).

He was a member of the New York State Senate (3rd D.) from 1841 to 1844, sitting in the 64th, 65th, 66th and 67th New York State Legislatures. He resigned his seat on December 3, 1844.

He was one of three secretaries (with James F. Starbuck and Francis Seger) of the New York State Constitutional Convention of 1846.

Justice Simeon Strong (1736–1805) was his grandfather; President of the Wisconsin Territorial Council Marshall Strong (1813–1864) was his brother.

Sources
The New York Civil List compiled by Franklin Benjamin Hough (pages 58, 133f and 147; Weed, Parsons and Co., 1858)
The History of the Descendants of Elder John Strong, of Nirthampton, Mass. by Benjamin Woodbridge Dwight (Albany, 1871; Vol. II, pg. 1338–1343)

1810 births
1848 deaths
Democratic Party New York (state) state senators
Politicians from Amherst, Massachusetts
Politicians from Troy, New York
New York (state) state court judges
Amherst College alumni
19th-century American politicians
19th-century American judges